Narmand may refer to:
 Narmand, Hormozgan
 Narmand, Kerman